The American Council of the Blind (ACB) is a nationwide organization in the United States.  It is an organization mainly made up of blind and visually impaired people who want to achieve independence and equality (although there are many sighted members with common aims).

History
The American Council of the Blind was formed out of the dissolution of the Braille Free Press Association in 1961. Braille Free Press had been set up in 1959. It was highly critical of the American Foundation for the Blind, and the ACB was formed as an alternative to it.

The ACB was also very critical of the National Federation of the Blind which many of its first members had also originally belonged to. Relations between the two organizations have been strained ever since—to the extent that they tend to schedule their conventions at the same time, to deter people from being active in both organizations.

In 2013 the ACB elected Kim Charlson as its first female president, making her the first female president of a major national blindness consumer advocacy organization in the United States.

State affiliates
 Alabama Council of the Blind
 Alaska Independent Blind, Inc.
 Arizona Council of the Blind
 Arkansas Council of the Blind
 California Council of the Blind
 American Council of the Blind of Colorado, Inc.
 Connecticut Council of the Blind
 Delaware Council of the Blind and Visually Impaired
 DC Council of the Blind
 Florida Council of the Blind
 Georgia Council of the Blind
 Hawaii Association of the Blind
 Illinois Council of the Blind
 ACB of Indiana
 Iowa Council of the United Blind
 Kansas Association of the Blind and Visually Impaired
 Blue Grass Council of the Blind
 Kentucky Council of the Blind
 Louisiana Council of the Blind
 ACB of Maine
 ACB of Maryland
 Bay State Council of the Blind
 Michigan Council of the Blind And Visually Impaired
 ACB of Minnesota
 Mississippi Council of the Blind
 Missouri Council of the Blind
 Montana Blind and Low Vision Council
 ACB of Nebraska
 Nevada Council of the Blind
 New Jersey Council of the Blind
 ACB of New Mexico
 ACB of New York, Inc.
 North Carolina Council of the Blind
 North Dakota Association of the Blind
 ACB of Ohio
 Oklahoma Council of the Blind
 ACB of Oregon
 Pennsylvania Council of the Blind
 ACB of South Carolina
 South Dakota Association of the Blind
 Tennessee Council of the Blind
 ACB of Texas
 Utah Council of the Blind
 Vermont Council of the Blind
 American Council of the Blind of Virginia
 Virginia Association of the Blind
 Washington Council of the Blind
 Mountain State Council of the Blind
 Washington Council of the Blind
 ACB of Wisconsin
 Wyoming Council of the Blind

References

External links
 ACB home page

Blindness organizations in the United States
Health and disability rights organizations in the United States
501(c)(3) organizations
Non-profit organizations based in Washington, D.C.